Candice Lee Goucher is Professor of History and co-director of the Collective for Social and Environmental Justice at Washington State University, United States. She specialises in world history, African history, Caribbean history and the history of food. Her previous post was as Chair of the Black Studies department at Portland State University, Oregon.

Goucher has a master's degree in Art history and archeology from Columbia University and a Ph.D. (1984) in African history from the University of California, Los Angeles.

She was one of two lead scholars involved in a 26-part video and online course Bridging World History.

Her 2014 book Congotay! Congotay! A Global History of Caribbean Food (Routledge, 2014, ISBN ) won the Gourmand Award for "Best Book on Caribbean Food (National Category)" for 2016.

She is on the editorial board of the seven-volume Cambridge World History, and co-edited its volume 2:  A World with Agriculture, 12,000 BCE–500 CE (2015) with Graeme Barker.

References

External links

Year of birth missing (living people)
Living people
Washington State University faculty
Portland State University faculty
Columbia Graduate School of Arts and Sciences alumni
University of California, Los Angeles alumni
American women historians
Food historians
Historians of Africa
Historians of the Caribbean
21st-century American women